Observers maintain that corruption in Paraguay remains a major impediment to the emergence of stronger democratic institutions and sustainable economic development in Paraguay.

Duarte presidency 
President Nicanor Duarte's measures to combat corruption during his 2003-2008 administration included increased penalties for tax evasion and other measures to increase tax revenue, greater oversight of government spending, and a crackdown on the trade of contraband and counterfeit goods. 

He also removed members of the Supreme Court after corruption allegations surfaced against them.

Present situation 
On Transparency International's 2021 Corruption Perception Index, Paraguay scored a 30 on a scale from 0 ("highly corrupt") to 100 ("highly clean"). When ranked by score, Paraguay ranked number 128 among the 180 countries in the Index, where the country ranked number 1 is perceived to have the most honest public sector.

This ranking was an improvement from 2004 when the country was classified among the six most corrupt countries in the world and the second most corrupt in the Western Hemisphere. The opposition, however, has claimed that anti-corruption efforts have not been far-reaching enough because they have not addressed the clientelism that is pervasive in Paraguayan politics or the dominance of the Colorado Party in governmental institutions.

See also 
 Crime in Paraguay

References

Crime in Paraguay by type
Paraguay
Politics of Paraguay